The Vasco da Gama–Patna Superfast Express is a Superfast train belonging to South Western Railway zone that runs between  and  in India. It is currently being operated with 12741/12742 train numbers on a weekly basis.

Service

The 12741/Vasco da Gama–Patna SF Express has an average speed of 53 km/hr and covers 2229 km in 42h 15m. The 12742/Patna–Vasco da Gama SF Express has an average speed of 51 km/hr and covers 2229 km in 44h.

Route and halts 
The important halts of the train are:

Coach composite

The train has standard ICF rakes with a max speed of 110 km/h. The train consists of 24 coaches:

 1 AC II Tier
 2 AC III Tier
 11 Sleeper coaches
 1 Pantry car
 5 General Unreserved
 2 Seating cum Luggage Rake

Schedule

Traction

Both trains are hauled by an Itarsi Loco Shed-based WDM-3A or WDM-3D diesel locomotive from Patna to Vasco da Gama and vice versa.

Rake sharing 

The train shares its rake with 17315/17316 Vasco da Gama–Velankanni Weekly Express, 17311/17312 Chennai Central–Vasco da Gama Weekly Express, 17309/17310 Yesvantpur–Vasco da Gama Express.

Direction reversal

Train reverses its direction 1 time:

Accident
On 24 November 2017, train number 12741 was derailed near platform number two of Manikpur railway station in Chitrakoot division, Uttar Pradesh. The train was derailed at 4:18 am (IST), with three people getting killed and at least nine injured. One coach of the train was half tilted in the incident. Seven injured were referred to the Manikpur CHC hospital while two were sent to the district hospital in Chitrakoot. According to ADG (Law and Order), Anand Kumar, "prima facie it appears that fractured railway track is the cause of accident as per local assessment".

See also 

 Vasco da Gama railway station
 Patna Junction railway station
 Yesvantpur–Vasco da Gama Express
 Vasco da Gama–Velankanni Weekly Express
 Chennai Central–Vasco da Gama Weekly Express

Notes

References

External links 

 12741/Vasco - Patna SF Express
 12742/Patna - Vasco Express

Transport in Vasco da Gama, Goa
Transport in Patna
Express trains in India
Rail transport in Goa
Rail transport in Maharashtra
Rail transport in Madhya Pradesh
Rail transport in Uttar Pradesh
Rail transport in Bihar
Railway services introduced in 2008